Ethayum Thangum Ithayam is a 1962 Indian Tamil-language film directed by P. Neelakantan. The film stars S. S. Rajendran and C. R. Vijayakumari. Screenplay was written by C. N. Annadurai.

Plot 
Singaravelar, a wealthy person, went for hunting. He met a jungle woman Sivakami and married her. He went back to his place assuring Sivakami that he would soon come back and take her with him. But he never returned. Sivakami gave birth to a male child. Sivakami's mother handed over the baby to another person. This man, Pakkiri, named the child as Madasamy. In the meantime, Singaravelar sent someone to fetch Sivakami, but he came and reported that Sivakami is dead. Singaravelar marries his elder sister's daughter. When Madasamy grew up, Pakkiri told him his life story. Madasamy started looking for his father to take vengeance. He had a pistol with him. Mistaking another person for his father he attacked, but he was caught and was produced in the courts on a charge of theft. Singaravelar was presiding as the judge. During the proceedings, Singaravelar realises that Madasamy is his son. How the problems are solved forms the rest of the story.

Cast 
The following list was compiled from the film's song book.
 S. S. Rajendran
 M. R. Radha
 R. Muthuraman
 C. R. Vijayakumari
 B. S. Saroja
T. K. S. Natarajan

Guest Artistes
 K. R. Ramasamy
 O. A. K. Thevar
 Manorama
 M. S. S. Packiam

Soundtrack 
Music was composed by T. R. Pappa, while the lyrics were written by A. Maruthakasi, M. K. Athmanathan, Thanjai N. Ramaiah Dass, Pattukkottai Kalyanasundaram and Vaali.

The song "Kannum Kannum Kalanthathu" was first recorded for gramophone record sung by K. R. Ramasamy and S. Janaki. A word (Praathalu) in the song was objected by the censor board as vulgar. Then the song was re-recorded with A. L. Raghavan and S. Janaki singing. This version was included in the film. So, the gramophone record contains K. R. Ramasamy's voice, A. L. Raghavan's voice is heard as playback for K. R. R. in the film.

The song "Ullam Thedathe Endru Solluthe" was removed from the film.

References

External links 
 

1962 films
1960s Tamil-language films
Indian drama films
Films scored by T. R. Pappa
1962 drama films